The Motzfeldt mine is a large niobium mine located in southern Greenland in Kujalleq. Motzfeldt represents one of the largest niobium reserves in Greenland having estimated reserves of 130 million tonnes of ore grading 1% niobium and 0.04% tantalum.

See also
 Qaqqaarsuk deposit

References 

Niobium mines in Greenland